Stach may refer to:

 Stach (surname)
 Stach Konwa (died c. 1734), legendary Polish hero
 93256 Stach, an asteroid

See also

Stas (disambiguation)
 Stash (disambiguation)
 "Stach Stach", a 2002 song by Michael Youn and his band Bratisla Boys